Tallink is an Estonian shipping company operating Baltic Sea cruiseferries and ropax ships from Estonia to Finland, Estonia to Sweden and Finland to Sweden. It is the largest passenger and cargo shipping company in the Baltic Sea region. It owns Silja Line and a part of SeaRail. Tallink Hotels runs four hotels in Tallinn. It is also the co-owner of a taxi company Tallink Takso.

It is a publicly traded company, that is listed in Tallinn Stock Exchange. A major shareholder is an investment company AS Infortar, that also has ownership in several Tallink subsidiaries and a natural gas company Eesti Gaas.

History

Background 
Regular around-the-year passenger ferry services began in 1968, on MS Tallinn, which served the route until it was replaced by the new  in 1980.

1989–1992 

In May 1989, ESCO formed a new subsidiary, joint venture Tallink, together with the Finnish Palkkiyhtymä Oy. During her first year in service the Tallink carried 166,000 passengers.
Later in the same year the freighter  joined the Tallink on the Helsinki–Tallinn route and Tallink was established as the name of the company as well as the main ship. At the same time ESCO still operated the Georg Ots in the same route, essentially competing with its own daughter company. This conflict was resolved in September 1991, when the Georg Ots was chartered to Tallink. In the early 1990s, passenger numbers on Helsinki–Tallinn traffic were steadily increasing, and during winters between 1992 and 1995, Tallink chartered  from Irish Ferries to increase capacity on the route.

1993–2000 

Tallink became a fully Estonian-owned company in 1993, when Palkkiyhtymä sold its shares of both the Tallink company and MS Tallink to ESCO. At this time, other companies were establishing themselves on the lucrative Helsinki–Tallinn traffic, including the Estonian New Line, owned by the Tallinn-based Inreko. ESCO and Inreko saw no sense in competing with each other and in January 1994, Tallink and Inreko Laeva AS were merged into AS Eminre. Tallink remained the marketing name for the company's fleet. Later in the same year Inreko purchased MS Nord Estonia from EstLine (a daughter company of ESCO and the Swedish Nordström & Thulin), renamed her  and placed her in Helsinki–Tallinn traffic for Tallink. Inreko also brought with them two fast hydrofoils, HS Liisa and HS Laura which began serving under the Tallink Express brand. In 1994, Tallink also attempted traffic from Estonia to Germany for the first time, with two chartered ferries  and  that were placed on the route Helsinki–Tallinn–Travemünde.

In September 1994, AS Eminre's operations were divided into two companies, one that took care of the traffic to Germany (which was soon closed down) and AS Hansatee which took the Helsinki–Tallinn traffic and the Tallink name. ESCO was the dominant partner in Hansatee, controlling 45% of the shares, whereas Inreko owned only 12.75% (the remaining 42.25% belonging to Eesti Ühispank, Estonia). In 1995, Hansatee brought the first large ferry into Helsinki–Tallinn traffic when they chartered MS Mare Balticum from EstLine and renamed her . Following various disputes between ESCO and Inreko (most notably about the charter price of Vana Tallinn), Inreko sold their shares of AS Hansatee to ESCO in December 1996. At the same time Inreko sold the Tallink Express hydrofoils to Linda Line, Estonia, and begun operating the Vana Tallinn on Helsinki–Tallinn traffic under the name TH Ferries.

In 1997, a second large ferry was brought to Tallink's traffic when the company chartered  from Stena Line. To replace the lost hydrofoils, Hansatee purchased a new express catamaran in May 1997, which was named . In July of the same year, Tallink purchased the freighter  which opened a line from Paldiski to Kapellskär, Tallink's first route to Sweden. In October, the original MS Tallink, which no longer conformed modern safety regulations, was sold. Two months later Hansatee purchased their first fast ferry capable of carrying cars, .

2000–2006 

A few months earlier, in August 2000, Hansatee had ordered their first newbuild the 2,500-passenger cruiseferry  from the Finnish Aker Finnyards. This was the first ship in a new building programme that between 2001 and 2010, cost €1.2 billion. In June 2001, Tallink purchased , while next month, EstLine was declared bankrupt.

In November of the same year, the classic Georg Ots was sold to the government of Russia. In 2004, three news ships joined Tallink's fleet,  and  alongside the Romantikas sister  which was placed on Tallinn–Stockholm route, replacing MS Fantaasia which in turn started a new route from Helsinki to St. Petersburg via Tallinn. This route proved unprofitable and was terminated in January 2005. Later in 2005, Tallink ordered a sister ship of the to-be-delivered  and a fast ropax ferry from Aker Finnyards as well as another ropax ferry from the Fincantieri yard in Italy. On December 9, 2005, Tallink was listed at Tallinn Stock Exchange.

2006–present 
In 2006, Tallink purchased the Baltic Sea operations of Superfast Ferries from Attica Group, opened a route between Riga and Stockholm (with MS Fantaasia, which was within a month replaced by MS Regina Baltica), took delivery of the new  which replaced Romantika on the Tallinn–Helsinki route, transferred Romantika to the Tallinn–Stockholm route, and withdrew AutoExpress from service. A few months later, the company purchased the rival Finnish passenger line Silja Line from Sea Containers. The purchase of Superfast and Silja cost €780 million. In October 2006, the company expressed an interest in making an offer to operate ferries on the state-subsidized routes between the Swedish island of Gotland and the Swedish mainland between 2009 and 2015.

From the beginning of 2007, the former Superfast ships were moved under the Tallink brand and their route changed to Tallinn–Helsinki–Rostock. In April of the same year, Aker Yards delivered the fast cruiseferry MS Star that had been ordered in 2005. With the delivery of the Star, Meloodia was chartered to Balearic Islands, Spain for ten months and later sold, while AutoExpress 3 and AutoExpress 4 were also withdrawn. During April 2007, Tallink also ordered a third Galaxy-class cruiseferry from Aker Yards.

Two new ships followed in 2008, with the fast cruiseferry  delivered from Fincantieri and the second Galaxy-class ship, delivered from Aker Yards. Both ships were placed in service between Helsinki and Tallinn With the delivery of the former, the last AutoExpress fast craft, AutoExpress 2, was withdrawn from Helsinki–Tallinn service. Baltic Princess, meanwhile, replaced her sister ship Galaxy, which was transferred to the fleet of Silja Line. With the arrival of Galaxy  was left without employment in the Silja fleet, and she was in turn transferred to Tallink's fleet, joining Regina Baltica on the Riga–Stockholm service. In November 2008, one of three ships purchased from Superfast Ferries in 2006, was chartered to the Canadian Marine Atlantic ferry operator for five years. In April 2009, Tallink took delivery of its last newbuilding (as of 2010), when  was delivered STX Europe (the former Aker Yards). The new ship was placed on the Tallinn–Mariehamn–Stockholm service alongside Victoria I. Romantika, that had been Victoria Is running mate since 2006, was in turn transferred to the Riga–Stockholm route, where she replaced Regina Baltica that was in turn chartered out to Acciona Trasmediterránea.

In December 2009, it was reported that the company was struggling to repay its debts of €1.1 billion. The fiscal year ending in August resulted in an operating loss, and the company had to re-negotiate with its 15 funding banks debt repayment schedules for the years 2009–2011. The banks took a more controlling role in the company: it could no longer pay dividends, make investments, or sign new contracts without its creditors' approval. Tallink also had to pick up the pace in debt repayments if conditions were to improve, and had to look for options to sell or rent some of its ships. Most of its debts were incurred for purchasing Silja Line for €470 million and Superfast Ferries for €310 million.

The ships spent the winter of 2009–2010 laid up in Kopli, before re-commencing service between Helsinki and Rostock in April 2010.

Stena Line will use these ships for Scotland–Northern Ireland service. The vessels will be delivered after the end of the high season in August 2011. Until then they are operated on their current route by Tallink. The prospective charter will improve the result of these vessels so that they will be generating a profit.

In February 2015, the company signed a building contract for the construction of its first liquefied natural gas-fueled ship, the MS Megastar which began from January 2017, providing a six-times-a-day Tallinn–Helsinki–Tallinn service. 

In 2018, during the course of over 10,000 voyages the company carried 9.756 million passengers, 1.25 million vehicles and 384,958 cargo units.

In 2019, the company carried 9.763 million passengers and 385,000 cargo units.

In 2019, Tallink reached a franchise agreement with a global fast-food company, Burger King to open restaurants in Estonia, Latvia, and Lithuania, and according to the agreement, Tallink will have exclusive rights for running Burger King eateries in the Baltic states for 20 years. The company plans to open the first restaurant in each Baltic state in the first half of 2020. The enlargement of Burger King will employ around 800 people in Estonia, Latvia, and Lithuania.

In December 2020, Tallink made its last trip from Riga, the capital of Latvia.  It was sailed by the ship MS Victoria I from Riga to Stockholm.  And in 2022, Tallink stopped cooperation with Latvia.

Controversies

Ignored man overboard 
In April 2006, Tallink's ferry , en route from Tallinn to Stockholm, ignored when multiple passengers reported that a passenger had fallen overboard. The crew refused to stop the ship to search for the passenger and the 21-year-old Estonian male perished in the incident. Tallink later accepted no responsibility for the accident, emphasizing that none of the passengers confirmed actually seeing the man falling overboard or in the water.

Fleet

Current fleet

On charter

Former vessels 
Ships that are still in use are marked in green.

See also 
Kihnu Veeteed – Estonian ferry company
TS Laevad – Estonian ferry company

References

Notes

Bibliography

External links 

Official site
Tallink at Fakta om Fartyg (Swedish)
History of ESCO, EstLine and Tallink by Joni Huopana (Finnish)

Ferry companies of Estonia
Companies based in Tallinn
Shipping companies of the Soviet Union
1989 establishments in Estonia
Companies established in 1989
Estonian brands
Companies listed on Nasdaq Tallinn
Companies listed on Nasdaq Helsinki